An asset in economic theory is a durable good which can only be partially consumed (like a portable music player) or input as a factor of production (like a cement mixer) which can only be partially used up in production.  The necessary quality for an asset is that value remains after the period of analysis so it can be used as a store of value.  As such, financial instruments like corporate bonds and common stocks are assets because they store value for the next period.  If the good or factor is used up before the next period, there would be nothing upon which to place a value.

As a result of this definition, assets only have positive futures prices.  This is analogous to the distinction between consumer durables and non-durables.  Durables last more than one year.  A classic durable is an automobile. A classic non-durable is an apple, which is eaten and lasts less than one year. Assets are that category of output which economic theory places prices upon.  In a simple Walrasian equilibrium model, there is but a single period and all items have prices.  In a multi-period equilibrium model, while all items have prices in the current period.  Only assets can survive into the next period and thus only assets can store value and as a result, only assets have a price today for delivery tomorrow.  Items which depreciate 100% by tomorrow have no price for delivery tomorrow because by tomorrow it ceases to exist.

The subfield of asset pricing (or valuation) is the financial evaluation of the value of such assets; the primary method used by today's financial analysts is the discounted cash flow method.  With this method, an asset's future cash flows are either assumed to be known with certainty (as in a treasury bond which is risk free) or estimated.  These future cash flows are discounting used present values.

The Flow of Funds tables from the Federal Reserve System provide data about assets, which are tangible assets and financial assets, and liabilities. The difference, assets minus liabilities, is net worth.

External links
 Balance sheet tables, statistical releases of Federal Reserve System

See also
 Asset
 Asset pricing

 
Business economics